Euro 2000: The Official Album is an album with various artists, released on 12 June 2000 as the official music album for UEFA Euro 2000 in Belgium and the Netherlands.

Track listing

Charts

References

UEFA Euro 2000
2000 compilation albums
UEFA European Championship albums